Little Wobby is a suburb of the Central Coast region of New South Wales, Australia, located on the north bank of the Hawkesbury River. It is part of the  local government area.

It is geographically the southernmost point of the "NSW Central Coast".

History
Little Wobby was originally occupied by the Commonwealth Military Forces during the Second World War.  Several buildings were erected along the shoreline to house artillery batteries in case of a Japanese invasion through Broken Bay and the Hawkesbury River.  A submarine net was also put in place across the river.  Two of these buildings still exist as dwellings, into which they were converted after the war.  In the 1970s a plan was mooted for the State government to purchase all of the properties along the shore and demolish the houses in order to rehabilitate the land and return it to being part of the national park.  This never went ahead.  The only public utilities the houses enjoy are telephone and electricity.  There is no town water or sewage connection:  these are replaced with water tanks and septic tanks respectively.

The land-line is in the Sydney (02) 9XXX-XXXX range; and not the (02) 434X-XXXX range, like the rest of the NSW Central Coast.

Geography
Development consists of a few residences, most of which are used only as weekenders by people from Sydney. Access to properties is by boat only, as no roads exist in the area.

Most of the suburb's area is part of the Broken Bay Sport and Recreation Centre, a  bushland reserve at the mouth of the Hawkesbury River, which offers several walking trails including the Highway Ridge Trail which passes close to the residential area and extends north into the Brisbane Water National Park.

References

External links
 Broken Bay Sport and Recreation Centre (NSW Sport and Recreation)

Suburbs of the Central Coast (New South Wales)